Luzula arcuata is a species of flowering plant in the rush family Juncaceae with the modern common name curved wood-rush (formerly curved mountain hair-rush). The plant is native to mountains of northern Europe, north-western and north-eastern Asia and north-western North America.

Description
Luzula arcuata is a short (up to 10 cm), tufted, shortly rhizomatous, grass-like perennial herb. Leaves channelled, hairy. The longer flower stalks droop, curving downwards.

Distribution
It has a very local distribution, confined to open ground and mountain summit plateaux above 1,250 metres that are sufficiently exposed to be kept snow-free. Its native distribution includes Iceland, Svalbard, northern Norway and Scottish mountains and mountains of Western North America and the Kamchatka peninsula.

References

arcuata